Pycnostysanus azaleae or Seifertia azaleae is an ascomycete fungus that is a plant pathogen infecting azaleas and rhododendrons.

References

External links 
 Index Fungorum
 USDA ARS Fungal Database

Fungal plant pathogens and diseases
Ornamental plant pathogens and diseases
Ascomycota enigmatic taxa